Heaton Lodge railway station co-served the suburb of Bradley, Huddersfield, in the historical county of West Riding of Yorkshire, England, from 1847 to 1864 on the Leeds, Dewsbury and Manchester Railway.

History 
The station was opened on 2 August 1847 by the Lancashire and Yorkshire Railway. It was known as Heaton Lodge Junction in Bradshaw until 1849. It was a short-lived station, closing on 1 November 1864.

References 

Disused railway stations in West Yorkshire
Former Lancashire and Yorkshire Railway stations
Railway stations in Great Britain opened in 1847
Railway stations in Great Britain closed in 1864
1847 establishments in England
1864 disestablishments in England
Kirkburton